Was Justice Denied? is an American television show that aired on TNT on June 20, 2000. The special was narrated by Miguel Ferrer.

Overview
The show features Burton Roberts, Charlie Stone and Jeralyn Merritt, as they reviewed the facts surrounding the 1996 conviction of Dale Helmig for the murder of his 55-year-old mother, Norma, who was found floating in the Osage River in Linn, Missouri. The second case involved the 1992 conviction of Beverly Monroe for the shooting death of her wealthy, long-time lover, 60-year-old art collector Roger de la Burde in Powhatan, Virginia.

References

TNT (American TV network) original programming